Clarence Wesley Prince (April 8, 1907 - 30 October 1980) was an American jazz and R&B musician. He played the double bass.

Life and work 
Prince was born in  Pasadena, California. His father was a preacher; his brother was the jazz musician Henry Prince (who played in Les Hite's band), and he was a cousin of the R&B musician Peppy Prince.

Between 1938 and 1941, he played in a trio with pianist and singer Nat King Cole and guitarist Oscar Moore. In addition, he participated in recordings by Louis Armstrong (1936) and King Perry (1946). Under his own name, he played on several tracks for Excelsior Records. He participated in 29 recording sessions from 1936 to 1946.

For Nat Cole in 1940, he wrote the song "Gone with the Draft" (the title is a play on the popular Hollywood film Gone with the Wind as well as an allusion to the fact that Cole escaped military service because of his flat feet). In August 1942, Prince was drafted for military service  In later years, he worked in the aviation industry. Prince never recorded as a session leader.

References

External links 

Jazz-blues guitarists
1907 births
1980 deaths
American jazz double-bassists
Male double-bassists
20th-century American guitarists
20th-century double-bassists
20th-century American male musicians
American male jazz musicians
King Cole Trio members